Gehyra moritzi is a species of gecko endemic to the Northern Territory of Australia.

References

Gehyra
Reptiles described in 2014
Geckos of Australia